Saint-Rhémy-en-Bosses is a village and comune in the Aosta Valley, region in the north-western Italy.

Geography 
Saint-Rhémy is the last Italian village before the Swiss border, about 20 kilometers northwest of Aosta.

The town is crossed by the river Artanavaz, tributary of the Buthier.

 Seismic classification: zone 4 (very low seismicity).

History 
Its Latin name was Endracinum: in Roman times an important mansio stood on the valley to control the road, since the village was located in a strategic point for trade through the Alps. 

It suffered the invasions of the Huns, the Burgundians, the Lombards, the Carolingians and the Saracens, from the VI to the X century. According to tradition, during the Burgundy domination King Gontrano, passing through the valley, was baptized by Saint Remigius, Archbishop of Reims, in 496 AD, thus giving his name to the town.

Saint-Rhémy-en-Bosses is mentioned in the  travelogue of Sigeric of Canterbury who, around 990, went to Rome to receive the Pallium from the hands of Pope John XV; this route would have been called Via Francigena, in the following centuries. In particular, the locality represented the XLVIII stage (submansio), and was defined by the Archbishop of Canterbury Sce Remei. The Archbishop stayed there before crossing the Great St. Bernard Pass.

In the Fascist ventennio, the place name was translated into Italian and renamed San Remigio, from 1939 to 1946. The name was later restored to Saint-Rhémy until 1991, when it took its present form.

Coat of Arms 
The coat of arms of the municipality is described as follows:

«Silver to the head bowed of five pieces of red. External ornaments from the Comune»

Product
The spicy, PDO recognised pork product Vallée d’Aoste Jambon de Bosses is produced here

Notes and references

Cities and towns in Aosta Valley